The Surya is a river in Perm Krai, Russia, a right tributary of the Uls, which in turn is a tributary of the Vishera. It flows into the Uls River  from the larger river's mouth.

References 

Rivers of Perm Krai